Nederlandse Organisatie voor Toegepast Natuurwetenschappelijk Onderzoek (TNO) is an independent research organisation in the Netherlands that focuses on applied science.

The organisation also conducts contract research, offers specialist consulting services, and grants licences for patents and specialist software. TNO tests and certifies products and services, and issues an independent evaluation of quality. Moreover, TNO sets up new companies to market innovations.

Background 
TNO was established by law in 1932 to support companies and governments with innovative, practicable knowledge.
As a statutory organisation, TNO has an independent position that allows to give objective, scientifically founded judgments. It is similar to the following:

 CSIR in Ghana
 CSIR in India
 CSIR in South Africa
 CSIRO in Australia
 Fraunhofer Society in Germany
 SINTEF in Norway

Furthermore, TNO also held 10% of the Austrian research centre Joanneum Research from 2004 to 2014.

TNO fulfils the role of innovator on behalf of the Ministry of Defence, the Ministry of Social Affairs and Employment, and the Geological Survey of the Netherlands. In these cases, TNO is entrusted with government responsibilities related to defence and security, workforce participation and the Geological Survey.

Scope of work
TNO's strategy is based on technological advances and trends in society. The work of TNO is focused on 9 domains which are in line with the challenges and goals of the national economic policy, based on so-called Top Sectors, and with social issues relevant to The Netherlands and Europe.

TNO's financial model
TNO is a not-for-profit knowledge organisation. In order to ensure continuity the organisation generates a modest profit in order to fund investments, ensure continuity in knowledge development and a sustainable and healthy financial position.

The Early Research Programmes and Shared Innovation Programmes are always funded in part with public funds. The knowledge created in this way is subsequently further developed as part of public-private research with partners; this process is also referred to as "shared-innovation". In addition research results are further developed and applied in contract research, which is fully funded by TNO's customers. Through this process, TNO  claims, it brings research closer to the market and actively transfers it through spin-outs and licenses.

Typical projects
TROPOMI: a satellite instrument that will carry out measurements on the troposphere, giving an accurate picture of the state of the changing climate. TNO designed the optomechanical heart of the instrument - the ultraviolet visible near-infrared optical bench module (UVN-OBM).
Personalized Digital Health: If diagnosis, prognosis and treatment are geared towards the individual, this helps to prevent overtreatment or undertreatment, and thus reduces overall healthcare costs. TNO bases all efforts to improve the quality of digital healthcare focusing on Prediction, Prevention, Personalization, Participation and Privacy.
Hybridisation of Trucks and Buses: This project, led by TNO, focuses on the Total Cost of Ownership reduction for trucks and buses offering significant zero emission capability, whilst still preserving longer driving range for regional operation.
Truck Platooning: This project creates truck platooning technology that should make automated driving on public roads practically possible. Truck platooning has the potential to make road transport faster, cheaper, cleaner and safer while at the same time increasing road capacity.
The North Sea Energy project is a consortium project to enable emission-free energy production in the North Sea. 
Blockchain: TNO provides a Blockchain Laboratory to projects researching the application of blockchain technology to various domains.
 Real-Time Intelligence (RTI): In the TNO RTI-Lab improvement of police effectiveness in e.g. finding missing persons is researched.
Lifestyle as a Medicine: In cooperation with LUMC this project aims to replicate in people the completely curing of type 2 diabetes in mice with a change in lifestyle.
Shaded Dome: In cooperation with the armed forces a dome structure was designed that protects against harmful weather conditions, provides ballistic protection, has a very low energy consumption and is easy to erect and dismantle.
 Energy-saving asphalt: New asphalt saves fuel and reduces CO2 emissions.
The GeoERA programme: A first step towards making geological knowledge about our continent freely accessible and transnational. Within the programme, dozens of institutions from 31 countries are cooperating on geological research projects.
Innovation for Development: A programme designed to disseminate research results to small and medium-sized enterprises and to use innovations across the developing world.
SolaRoad: TNO was part of the consortium that has built the world's first bike path made from solar panels, known as a "SolaRoad".

Locations
TNO is headquartered in The Hague. Other locations include: Amsterdam, Delft, Rijswijk, Leiden, Groningen, Helmond, Petten, Soesterberg, Utrecht, Zeist and Eindhoven. TNO also has international branch offices in Shin-Yokohama (Japan), Toronto (Canada), Brussels (Belgium), Doha (Qatar), Singapore and Aruba. The locations Hoofddorp and Enschede were closed in 2014.

Criticism
During World War II, the organisation grew from having an insignificant role to a controlling role in a number of large institutes under the occupation of the Nazis. As a rector of the University of Utrecht he fired the Jewish professors Ornstein, Roos and Wolff and the Jewish student assistants Fisher, Katz, Pais and Van der Hoeven. He was member of the board of the AKU, which was controlled by the Germans.

In 2006, TNO-ITSEF, a subsidiary organisation of TNO, was criticized for resisting publication of its test reports regarding widely used voting computers in the Netherlands. In the same year a Swiss research group refuted a widely publicized TNO report claiming UMTS radiation is a health hazard. The organisation also received criticism after the evacuation of 200 residents of an Amsterdam housing estate over fears of its structural integrity when the construction had been technically approved by TNO only five months earlier.

Also in 2006, TNO was criticized for their handling of an investigation into the collapse of a balcony in Maastricht in 2003 that killed two people.

In 2018 TNO was criticized for their report about the fireworks disaster in Enschede on 13 May 2000, being accused of committing fraud to disguise the cause of the disaster, according to an investigation by Paul van Buitenen.

References

External links

Corporate platform for blogs, interviews and background stories

Research institutes in the Netherlands
Science and technology in the Netherlands
1932 establishments in the Netherlands
Scientific organizations established in 1932